A playlist is a list of video or audio files that can be played back on a media player in a desired order.

Playlist may also refer to:

Albums
 Playlist (Babyface album), 2007
 Playlist (Birds of Tokyo album), 2015
 Playlist (Geri Halliwell album), 2016
 Samurai Champloo Music Record: Playlist, a Samurai Champloo soundtrack album, 2004
 Playlist, an album by Salmo, 2018
 Playlist, a series of compilation albums issued by Sony Music label Legacy Recordings (and see See also section below)

Other uses
 "Playlist", a song by Ufo361 with Sonus030, 2020
 Playlist.com, a defunct Internet radio service
 The Playlist, a British children's entertainment and music television series
 Playlist Studio, better known as Playlist is a South Korean production company

See also
 , for a listing of Sony/Legacy compilation albums
 Playlist Your Way (disambiguation), entries in a compilation album series issued by Universal/Ruff Ryders/Def Jam